Ali Akbarpour (born 8 October 1985 in Tehran), also known as Soheil Akbarpour is an Iranian Mixed Martial artist and Brazilian jiu-jitsu fighter. He is a member of the Iranian national JuJitsu team (JJIF) and is ranked First in Contact JuJitsu according to the International JuJitsu Federation (JJIF).

Career

National team 

 2022 World JuJitsu championship (JJIF)
  Gold (1): 2022

 2021 Asian JuJitsu championship (JJIF)
  Gold (1): 2021
2023 Asian Adult Contact juhitsu Championship (JJIF) Thailand - Bangkok
  Gold (1): 2023
2023 Asian Adult jiu-jitsu Championship (JJIF) Thailand- Bangkok
  Bronze (1): 2023

Mixed martial arts record 

|-
| Win
| align=center| 1–0
| Ravindra Balhara
| TKO
| Sangai MMA - Fight Night 2
| 
| align=center|1
| align=center|
| Imphal, India
| 
|-
| Win
| align=center| 0–0
| Isaac Dull
| TKO
| Underground Fight Night 1
| 
| align=center| 3
| align=center| 
| Mumbai, India
|

References

External links 

 
 
 

Living people
Iranian male mixed martial artists
Heavyweight mixed martial artists
Asian Games competitors for Iran
1985 births
Iranian jujutsuka